Eigirdas, married female form Eigirdaitė, maiden name form Eigirdienė,  is a Lithuanian name.

Notable people with this name include:
 Arūnas Eigirdas (born 1953), Lithuanian politician
 Eduardas Eigirdas (lt) (born 1970), Lithuanian journalist
 Eigirdas Žukauskas (born 1992), Lithuanian basketball player